Laura Michele Fortino (born January 30, 1991) is a Canadian ice hockey player for Markham Thunder. On October 3, 2011, she was named to the Team Canada roster that participated in the 2011 4 Nations Cup. Of note, she was the first overall selection in the 2014 CWHL Draft.

Playing career
In 2004, Fortino played for the Hamilton Reps (Bantam AA Boys) and she won a silver medal at the Ontario provincials, with honourable mention going to her AA defence partner Kyle Rooney. As a member of Stoney Creek, she won a bronze medal at the 2007 PWHL championships. At the 2007 National Women's Under-18 Championships in Kitchener, Ontario, she won a gold medal with Ontario Red. The following year, Fortino won a gold medal with Stoney Creek at the OWHA provincials and at the PWHL championship of 2008. In 2007–08, Fortino led PWHL defencemen in scoring. She won a gold medal with Ontario Red at the 2008 National Women’s Under-18 Championships in Napanee, Ontario. In 2009, Fortino won a silver medal with Stoney Creek at the OWHA provincials. Fortino ranked second among PWHL defencemen in scoring in 2008–09.

NCAA
Fortino joined the Cornell Big Red in 2009 and she earned All-America honours as a freshman. She led NCAA defencemen, Cornell defencemen and Cornell freshmen in scoring in 2009–10. As a member of the Big Red, she played in the NCAA championship game at the Frozen Four in 2010.

Hockey Canada
Named to 2014 Olympic roster for Canada. In August 2008, Fortino was a member of Canada's National Women's Under-18 Team for a three-game series against the United States in Lake Placid. Later that year, she would win a silver medal with Canada's National Women’s Under-18 Team at the 2008 IIHF World Women’s Under-18 Championship in Calgary.

The following year, she participated with Canada's National Women's Under-22 Team for a three-game exhibition versus the United States in Calgary. At the 2009 IIHF World Women's Under 18 championships, Fortino won a silver medal in Füssen, Germany. She was part of another three game exhibition series with the Under 22 team vs. the United States in August 2010. Fortino won a gold medal with Canada's National Women's Under-22 Team at the 2010 MLP Cup in Ravensburg, Germany. In the semifinal of the 2011 MLP Cup, Fortino scored a goal in a 9–0 rout of Russia to advance to the gold medal game. Fortino would score another goal as Canada beat Sweden in the final by a 6–0 tally to claim the gold medal. In March 2011, she was invited to the Canadian national women's ice hockey team selection camp to determine the final roster for the 2011 IIHF Women's World Championships. In a March 31, 2012 exhibition game versus the United States, Laura Fortino scored her first international goal in a 1–0 win at the Ottawa Civic Centre. She scored at 17:26 of the second period and was assisted by Marie-Philip Poulin, as she scored on American goaltender Molly Schaus. Fortino was credited for an assist feeding the puck to teammate, Marie-Philip Poulin when she scored the winning goal in Sochi against the United States.

Canadian Women's Hockey League (CWHL)
On August 19, 2014, Fortino was chosen first overall in the CWHL by the Brampton Thunder. She is the second alumna of the Stoney Creek Junior Sabres (PWHL) to be selected first overall.

For the 2015–2016 season she was named an Assistant Captain.

Personal life
Fortino is a Hamiltonian born and raised, and she is a distant relative of John Fortino of the Fortinos supermarket chain. She is of Italian descent.

Awards and honours
Cornell's co-Rookie of the Year 2009–10
ECAC First All-Star Team 2009–10
ECAC All-Rookie Team 2009–10
RBK Hockey/AHCA Women’s Division I 2009–10 First Team All-American 
2011 First Team All-America selection
2011–12 CCM Hockey Women’s Division I All-American: First Team
Player of the Game for Canada, 2012 IIHF Women's World Championship, April 8 contest vs. Finland
Gold medal recipient at the 2011 "Expressive Italian Hand Talkers Competition"
Nominated for 2015–2016 CWHL Most Valuable Player
2015–16 CWHL Defenceman of the Year

Career statistics

Hockey Canada

NCAA

CWHL

References

External links
 
 
 
 
 

1991 births
Living people
Brampton Thunder players
Canadian expatriate ice hockey players in the United States
Canadian people of Italian descent
Canadian women's ice hockey defencemen
Clarkson Cup champions
Cornell Big Red women's ice hockey players
Ice hockey people from Ontario
Ice hockey players at the 2014 Winter Olympics
Ice hockey players at the 2018 Winter Olympics
Markham Thunder players
Medalists at the 2014 Winter Olympics
Medalists at the 2018 Winter Olympics
Olympic ice hockey players of Canada
Olympic gold medalists for Canada
Olympic medalists in ice hockey
Olympic silver medalists for Canada
Sportspeople from Hamilton, Ontario
Professional Women's Hockey Players Association players